Cortazzo is a surname. Notable people with the surname include:

Ariel Cortazzo (1915–1998), Argentine screenwriter
Jess Cortazzo (1904–1963), American baseball player
Oreste Cortazzo (1836–1910/12), Italian born French painter, graphic artist, and illustrator

See also
Corazzo